John McLellan may refer to:
 John McLellan (ice hockey) (1928–1979), Canadian ice hockey player and coach
 John McLellan (journalist)
 John McLellan (songwriter)
 John McLellan (footballer)

See also
 John MacLellan, politician from Alberta, Canada
 John McClellan (disambiguation)
 John McClelland (disambiguation)